A list of British films released in 1924.

1924

See also
 1924 in film
 1924 in the United Kingdom

References

External links
 

1924
Films
Lists of 1924 films by country or language
1920s in British cinema